The First Christian Church on N. Main St. in Nashville, Arkansas was built in 1911.  It was a work of the noted church architect Benjamin D. Price and his son Max Charles Price.  It was listed on the National Register of Historic Places in 1982. It was removed from the National Register in 2010 due to major alterations to the building

References

Churches on the National Register of Historic Places in Arkansas
Gothic Revival church buildings in Arkansas
Churches completed in 1911
Churches in Howard County, Arkansas
Nashville, Arkansas
National Register of Historic Places in Howard County, Arkansas
1911 establishments in Arkansas